Odori may refer to:
Odori, a Japanese traditional dance
Odori ebi sometimes just called Odori, which in sushi refers to "dancing prawns", so called because they are alive and still moving on your plate.

Odori can also refer to
Bon Odori, meaning simply "Bon dance" is an event held during Bon Festival, the Japanese Buddhist holiday to honor the departed spirits of one's ancestors.
Awa Odori, a traditional Japanese dance from Tokushima also a feature of the Koenji Awa Odori festival in Koenji, Suginami, Tokyo which takes place on the last weekend in August each year. 
Kasa Odori, dance with paper umbrellas performed at Tottori City's Shan-shan festival.

ODORI can also refer to:
ODORI, Overt Distortion of Real Imagery. A 21st century visual art movement, portraying real imagery with defined and fragmented bold shapes and colours.